Oakthorpe and Donisthorpe or Oakthorpe, Donisthorpe and Acresford is a civil parish in the North West Leicestershire district of Leicestershire, England. According to the 2001 census it had a population of 2336, increasing to 2,637 at the 2011 census.    It includes Oakthorpe and Donisthorpe.

References

Civil parishes in Leicestershire
North West Leicestershire District